Full Sutton is a village and civil parish in the East Riding of Yorkshire, England.
According to the 2011 UK Census, Full Sutton parish had a population of 1,072, an increase on the 2001 UK Census figure of 977.

Located at Full Sutton is a high security prison, HMP Full Sutton.

Full Sutton is also home to a former air force station, RAF Full Sutton. Opened in 1944, the station operated as a bomber airfield during the Second World War. It would later be used to maintain a number of Thor missiles in readiness as part of the UK deterrent force, before finally closing in April 1963. During 1958 the BRSCC organised four races on the airfield's runways and perimeter roads (Full Sutton Circuit).  Full Sutton is now used as a general aviation airfield, with its own training facilities for the aspiring pilot.

The place was recorded in the Domesday Book as Sudtone, meaning "south settlement".  The prefix, first recorded in the 13th century, means "dirty", from the Old English fūl.

Governance
The parish has a joint parish council with Skirpenbeck, known as the Parish Council of Full Sutton and Skirpenbeck.

References

Villages in the East Riding of Yorkshire
Civil parishes in the East Riding of Yorkshire